Atractus nigricauda, the black-headed ground snake, is a species of snake in the family Colubridae. The species can be found in Peru.

References 

Atractus
Reptiles of Peru
Endemic fauna of Peru
Snakes of South America
Reptiles described in 1943
Taxa named by Karl Patterson Schmidt